Makoto Kaneko may refer to:

 Makoto Kaneko (businessman) (born 1945), Japanese businessman and horse owner
 Makoto Kaneko (footballer) (born 1975), Japanese former footballer
 Makoto Kaneko (baseball) (born 1975), Japanese baseball player
 Makoto Kaneko, Japanese voice actor, voice of Atsushi Tamai in Arifureta: From Commonplace to World's Strongest